Kirill Borisovich Putyrsky (Russian: Кирилл Борисович Путырский; born 1 October 1928) is a Russian rower who represented the Soviet Union. He competed at the 1952 Summer Olympics in Helsinki with the men's coxed four where they were eliminated in the semi-final repêchage.

References

1928 births
Living people
Soviet male rowers
Olympic rowers of the Soviet Union
Rowers at the 1952 Summer Olympics
Rowers from Saint Petersburg
European Rowing Championships medalists